Sumner County is the name of two counties in the United States:

 Sumner County, Kansas
 Sumner County, Tennessee